The La Plagne bobsleigh, luge, and skeleton track is a bobsleigh, luge, and skeleton track located in La Plagne, France. The track was the venue for the bobsleigh and luge competitions for the 1992 Winter Olympics whose host city was neighboring Albertville.

History
In 1986, Albertville was awarded the 1992 Winter Olympics over Sofia, Bulgaria; Falun, Sweden; Lillehammer, Norway; Cortina d'Ampezzo, Italy; Anchorage, Alaska, United States; and Berchtesgaden, West Germany. The track was constructed from September 1988 to December 1990 designed for use in bobsleigh and luge competitions with the drivers in mind. Ice team staff was recruited in August 1990 while the first ice test was performed in January 1991. The first bobsleigh test event was in February 1991 while the first luge test event was in March 1991. The track hosted the skeleton event of the FIBT World Championships in 1993. Since the 1992 Winter Olympics, the track has been host to programs on bobsleigh rides performed by 1998 Winter Olympic medalist Bruno Mingeon. The track was part of neighboring Annecy's bid package for the 2018 Winter Olympics which was submitted to the International Olympic Committee on 15 October 2009.

Statistics
When water is applied to ice up the track, a total of 15 ice workers manually apply the water to generate ice up to a thickness of 4 cm (1.6 inch) that is kept at a temperature of -7 to - 10 °C (14 to 19 °F). The outside of the track is covered with insulation and wood.  of electrical conduit connects the track from start to finish, including timing, television cables, computers, and sensors. Technicians from the bobsleigh and luge track in Igls, Austria assisted the ice workers during production and maintenance of the ice for the 1992 Winter Olympics.

Track lengths and turns

There are no turn names listed for the track.

Championships hosted
1992 Winter Olympics
FIBT World Championships: 1993 (Skeleton)

References

External links
FIBT track profile - Men's single luge starthouse is located above turn three and intersects with women's singles/ men's doubles luge prior to intersecting with the bobsleigh/ skeleton part of the track prior to turn five.
Official link to the bobsleigh, luge, and skeleton track. 
La Plagne bobsleigh, luge, and skeleton club website. 

Venues of the 1992 Winter Olympics
Olympic bobsleigh venues
Olympic luge venues
Bobsleigh, luge, and skeleton tracks
Sports venues in Savoie
Sports venues completed in 1991
1991 establishments in France